The Roki Tunnel (also called Roksky Tunnel, ;) is a mountain tunnel of the Transkam road through the Greater Caucasus Mountains, north of the village Upper Roka. It is the only road joining North Ossetia–Alania in Russia into South Ossetia, a breakaway republic of Georgia.

The tunnel, completed by the Soviet government in 1984, is one of only a handful of routes that cross the North Caucasus Range.
The other routes between Georgia and Russia include the Kazbegi–Verkhni Lars customs checkpoint on the Georgian Military Road, closed June 2006 and reopened 2010, and the Gantiadi–Adler crossing in Abkhazia which Georgia asserts functions illegally.

The tunnel has been important throughout the Georgian–Ossetian conflict. The South Ossetian authorities use tolls levied on tunnel traffic as one of their main sources of revenue. The Georgian government, backed by the United States, has long called for the South Ossetian side of the tunnel to be placed under the control of international monitors, rather than by the South Ossetian secessionists and their Russian allies.
When the Russian authorities blocked the Kazbegi-Verkhni Lars customs checkpoint between June 2006 and March 2010, the Roki Tunnel was the only available road route from Russia to South Ossetia. The tunnel was also used as a supply route for the Russian troops during the 2008 South Ossetia War.The tunnel was reconstructed due to damage caused by Russo-Georgian War. Reconstruction took two and half years and was finished in October 2015.

See also
 Georgian–Ossetian conflict
 2008 South Ossetia War

References

External links
 

Geography of Georgia (country)
Road tunnels in Russia
Tunnels in Georgia (country)
Ossetia
Buildings and structures in North Ossetia–Alania
Roads in South Ossetia
Tunnels completed in 1985
Road tunnels
Buildings and structures in South Ossetia
Transport in North Ossetia–Alania